The 2013 Ricardo Tormo GP3 Series round was the second round of the 2013 GP3 Series. It was held on 16 June 2013 at the Circuit Ricardo Tormo in Cheste, Spain.

Classification

Qualifying

 Nick Yelloly and Lewis Williamson were disqualified because their car did not comply with the rules.
 Patrick Kujala received a ten-place grid penalty for passing Aaro Vainio under the red flag.
 Ryan Cullen stayed outside of 110% qualifying time & issued with a 5 place grid penalty following incident in Barcelona Round 1.

Feature race

Sprint race

Notes

References

2013 GP3 round reports
Ricardo Tormo